Kalateh-ye Sheykhi (also Romanized as Kalāteh-ye Sheykhī; also known as Kalāt-e Sheykhī) is a village in Kakhk Rural District, Kakhk District, Gonabad County, Razavi Khorasan Province, Iran. At the 2006 census, its population was 110, in 35 families.

References 

Populated places in Gonabad County